Carolynn Sells (born 6 May 1973 in Preston, Lancashire) is an English former road racer. She grew up around motorcycle racing, a sport her father Dave Sells took up when she was five years old. He began racing in the Manx Grand Prix when she was 12. She has stated that her sole purpose, when she began short circuit racing herself at the age of 27, was to obtain a National Race licence so she could race on the Isle of Man TT Mountain Course. The highlight of her racing career was winning the 2009 Ultralightweight Manx Grand Prix, making her the first and as of 2022, the only woman to win a solo race on the Isle of Man TT Mountain Course, an achievement that earned her a Guinness World Record, and made her the Isle of Man Sportswoman of the Year 2009.

Racing

Sells raced numerous times on the roads of the Isle of Man, including 13 Manx Grand Prix starts between 2003 and 2009.

She also raced on the roads mostly in Ireland (between 2004 & 2008).

However, she started her racing career by participating in short circuit club racing, mostly in mainland Britain (between 2000 & 2009); her first race was at Jurby Airfield on the Isle of Man on her father's TZ250 race bike.

Awards

Short Circuits:

Andreas Racing Association (Isle of Man) Champion of Champions [400cc class], 2002 

Manx Grand Prix:

Southern 100:

First woman to have an overall win of a solo race at this event, during the 50th Anniversary meeting in 2005.

References

1973 births
English motorcycle racers
British motorcycle racers
Living people
Manx Grand Prix racers
Female motorcycle racers